Reinhold Boschert (born 6 February 1947) is a German athlete. He competed in the men's long jump at the 1968 Summer Olympics.

References

1947 births
Living people
Athletes (track and field) at the 1968 Summer Olympics
German male long jumpers
Olympic athletes of West Germany
Place of birth missing (living people)